Fortification Hill is a prominence adjacent to Lake Mead in the Lake Mead National Recreation Area; it is located at the northwest terminus region of the Black Mountains (Arizona), and specifically the north region of the Black Mountains. It is near a southern section of Lake Mead, and just northeast of Hoover Dam. It can easily be seen eastward across Las Vegas Bay or from the two northern mountain terminuses of Eldorado Mountains (Nevada), or the Black Mountains (Arizona).

The mountain prominence is plateau-like, or mesa-like with its highpoint at the southeast terminus, and sloping north and northwestwards toward Lake Mead.

The flat mountaintop, sloping northwards is composed of Tertiary basaltic lava flows.

See also 
 Black Mountains (Arizona)
 Eldorado Mountains
 List of mountains of Arizona by height

References

External links 
 Larger photo from the trailhead. Peakbagger.com.
 Geologic History of Lake Mead National Recreation Area . USGS.
 
 

Lake Mead National Recreation Area
Mountains of Arizona
Landforms of Mohave County, Arizona
Mountains of Mohave County, Arizona